Heroes of the Environment is a list published in Time magazine. After the inaugural list of 2007, the next list was published in September 2008. The list contains 30 entries, individuals or groups that have contributed substantially to the preservation of environment, and is divided into four categories: Leaders & Visionaries, Moguls & Entrepreneurs, Activists and Scientists & Innovators.

Leaders and visionaries
 
 Kevin Conrad
 Arnold Schwarzenegger
 Sheila Watt-Cloutier
 Alice Waters
 Marina Silva and Cristina Narbona Ruiz
 Kim Stanley Robinson
 Michael Shellenberger and Ted Nordhaus
 Habiba Sarabi
 Bharrat Jagdeo

Moguls & Entrepreneurs
 Jean-François Decaux and Jean-Charles Decaux (billionaire father, Jean-Claude Decaux)
 Mick Bremans
 John Doerr
 Peter Head
 Peggy Liu
 Shai Agassi

Activists
 
 Annie Leonard
 Wang Yongchen
 Gidon Bromberg, Nader Al-Khateeb and Munqeth Mehyar
 Jack Sim
 Balbir Singh Seechewal
 Silas Kpanan'Ayoung Siakor
 Craig Sorley
 Marina Rikhvanova
 Van Jones

Scientists & Innovators
 Soren Hermansen
 Lonnie Thompson
 Mohammed Dilawar
 Jurgenne Primavera
 Joachim Luther
 Vo Quy

See also
 Environmental Media Awards
 Global 500 Roll of Honour
 Global Environmental Citizen Award
 Goldman Environmental Prize
 Grantham Prize for Excellence in Reporting on the Environment
 Presidential Environmental Youth Awards
 Tyler Prize for Environmental Achievement
 Nuclear-Free Future Award

References

Environmental awards
Time (magazine)
Awards by magazines
Culture and the environment
2008 awards
2008 in the environment